Opala is a town in the Tshopo Province of the Democratic Republic of the Congo. It is the administrative center of the Opala Sector and of the Opala Territory. The town lies on the left bank of the Lomami River.

References

Populated places in Tshopo